1-(2-Nitrophenoxy)octane, also known as nitrophenyl octyl ether and abbreviated NPOE, is a chemical compound that is used as a matrix in fast atom bombardment mass spectrometry, liquid secondary ion mass spectrometry, and as a highly lipophilic plasticizer in polymer membranes used in ion selective electrodes.

See also 

 Glycerol
 3-Mercaptopropane-1,2-diol
 3-Nitrobenzyl alcohol
 18-Crown-6
 Sulfolane
 Diethanolamine
 Triethanolamine

References 

Nitrobenzenes
Phenol ethers